Fog's End Distillery is one of the first pioneers in California's craft distilling movement.  The distillery  is located in Gonzales, California. The distillery produces a range of moonshine spirits, under the direction of Head Distiller Craig Pakish.  Fog's End is known for producing award-winning small batch runs of Moonshine and Rum.

History 
Fog's End Distillery originally started business as C&C Shine LLC. Craig Pakish subsequently bought out his partner and re-branded the business Fog's End Distillery.  In his book, "Modern Moonshine Techniques", Bill Ownes presents C&C Shine as a how-to example start-up craft distillery on a shoestring budget. Craig Pakish started the distillery as a second career having retired from the Monterrey Sheriffs Department after 24 years on the force.

Production 
The distillery operates a single 60-gallon all copper still.  The still is direct fired by natural gas. The design of the still is a traditional Arkansas Diamond type design.  The Wash (distilling) uses is a traditional no-cook, sour-mash whiskey recipe.

Awards 

Whaler's Cove Silver Rum
 2022 Silver Medal - San Francisco World Spirits Competition 
 2022 Silver Medal - 88 points - Bartender Spirit Awards

Fog's End Monterey Rye
 2021 Gold Medal Rye Whiskey - TheFiftyBest.com
 2019 Gold Medal Rye Whiskey - TheFiftyBest.com
 2013 Bronze Medal - ADI - Fog's End Primo Agua Ardiente
 2012 Beverage Tasting Institute's International Review of Spirits
 2012 Silver Medal in Taste - MicroLiquor Spirit Awards

Fog's End California Moonshine

 2017 Silver Medal - TheFiftyBest.com
 2016 Silver Medal - Tastings.com

Products 
Current Spirits

 Fog’s End Distillery California Moonshine - 90 Proof.
 Fog’s End Monterey Rye - 90 Proof, Sour-Mash Whiskey.
 Fog’s End Hand Craft Your Flavor - White Dog with a piece of the oak barrel so you become the "Master Distiller" 
 Whaler's Cove Silver Rum  - 90 Proof, High-quality rum agricole. 

 Discontinued Spirits 

 Fog’s End White Dog Spirits  
 Fog’s End Primo Agua Ardiente

References

External links 
 

Moonshine producers
Rye whiskey
Cuisine of the Western United States
Distilleries in California
Food and drink companies established in 2009
Drink companies based in California
American companies established in 2009